Les Chics Types is a French rock band from Lyon.

History

Founded in 2005 by Christian Biral and Cedric Vernet, the band was originally a double act, whose principal influences included rock, folk and blues. Drummer Jean-Yves Demure and saxophonist Eric Corbet joined the band later.
Today, the band plays around the region of Lyon and participates in several festivals. (Sur la route de Tullins, Blues-sur-Seine, Grésiblues, etc.). Guest acts such as guitarist Philippe Crova and pianist Christophe Annequin play regularly alongside the band. 
Since 2012, the band has been signed with the French label Bluesiac, owned by Mike Lécuyer.

Une Belle Journée (2009) 

The year 2008 marks the release of their first album Une Belle Journée. The party of the official launch gets the sponsorship of the comedian Jacques Chambon. The band is cited by the local journalists and personalities like Gilles Verlant who wrote a preface on their website with these words: “Les Chics Types aren’t baby rockers… They sing songs nicely rock with positive lyrics, with pretention and that do good where they pass. And this, nowadays, my sweet lady is always good to take”.
The album Une Belle Journée is composed of 10 songs composed by the band, among which “Une Belle Journée”, “Les Chics Types”, “Le Joueur de Jazz” or “Faut pas Zoomer” recorded with the choral Sing All Gospel Mass Choir in Dijon.

Hey ! Ma B.O (2011) 

In May 2011, the new album Hey! Ma B.O got the participation of the singer Kent. The album, whose subtitle is “La Bande Originale des Chics Types”, includes 11 rock covers and an original song. The originality resides in the instrumentalization, which is only acoustic, guitar, acoustic bass, ukulele, harmonica and percussions. The album cover is a work signed by the photographer Oras. It's a tribute to the American painter Edward Hopper and to his painting Summer Evening. Hey! The original soundtrack has been received very positively by the music criticism and especially by the press specialized in rock, blues and folk music.

Alabama Blues (2012) 

In 2009, Les Chics Types present a new show named “Le mystère de la blue note” in which they produce, with the help of Jacques Chambon. “Le mystère de la blue note” an initiatory tale combining music and theater.
As a result of that show, the writer Jack Chaboud quote in a scene of his novel “L’homme à la tête d'horloge” published in September 2010. “He couldn't go further, because the door opened on a band of musicians in rehearsal. Oh these are the “Chics Types” who rehearse, exclaimed Victor, that's a rock band, I've already heard them here”

This show has been the beginning of the project of Alabama blues (October 2012/ Oskar Editions) an interactive book created with Maryvonne Rippert (Metal Melody, Blue cherry, …) and whom Les Chics Types, heroes of the story, also sign the original soundtrack. For the first time in young literature, a novel allows the reader to listen to tracks while reading, thanks to printed codes on the pages. The novel was quickly noticed by the blogosphere and the specialized press. The book was also quoted for his innovating side by the newspaper “Le Monde” on May 17, 2003.

The album Alabama Blues came out in parallel in December 2012. It contains the original soundtrack of the book: 13 new titles among which new compositions and covers. A 33 turns vinyl edition came out in the late 2013 on the Bluesiac label.

Musical groups from Lyon
French rock music groups